Charles Kinkead OD (3 October 1913 – 1 June 2007) was a Jamaican photojournalist and journalist, whose career spanned more than four decades.

Born Charles Harold Austin Kinkead, he worked as a news photographer for a number of Jamaican publications during his career. Among the newspapers who he worked for were The Gleaner, the Jamaica Standard, the Daily News, and the Jamaica Times, a weekly newspaper publication.

While working at the Daily News, Kinkead won the Seprod Human Interest Photograph Award in 1973. In 1978, Kinkead also won a national Jamaican award, the Order of Distinction, "for his contribution in the field of photo-journalism".

Kinkead moved to Florida in the 1980s to retire. He died of a stroke on 1 June 2007, aged 93, at a Florida hospital after becoming ill at his home in Pembroke Pines. He was survived by his wife and five children. A service of thanksgiving for his life was held on 14 June 2007 at the St James Cathedral in Spanish Town, Jamaica.

References

External links
"Veteran photographer Charles Kinkead dies",The Jamaica Gleaner, 8 June 2007.

Jamaican journalists
Male journalists
1913 births
2007 deaths
Jamaican photographers
Recipients of the Order of Distinction
People from Pembroke Pines, Florida
20th-century journalists
Jamaican emigrants to the United States